Thomas Bell Poole (1820–1865) was a lawman in Monterey County, who joined the Knights of the Golden Circle and served as a crewman of the Confederate privateer J. M. Chapman.

Biography
Poole was born in 1820 at Franklin County, Kentucky. He married Mary Caroline (Duff) Davis. He went to California during the Gold Rush and filed for a homestead in Monterey County. In 1856 he brought his family to Watsonville, California.

In 1858 Poole become an Undersheriff  for a Monterey County Sheriff, Henry DeGraw. He became known statewide for the hanging of the convicted murderer Jose Anastasio on February 12, 1858, despite the California Governor John B. Weller's order to postpone the execution. After Weller accused Poole of murder, Poole, supported by Monterey citizens, took part in public spat with the Governor mounting his defense on technicalities. Weller's clemency was mistakenly issued in the name of Anastasio Jesus. However, his two-year term of employment was not renewed by DeGraw.

After his wife died in 1860, Poole took his family to San Francisco and engaged in livery stables business. He joined with the Knights of the Golden Circle there. In 1863, he conspired with Asbury Harpending, Ridgley Greathouse, Alfred Rubery, and other California members of the Knights of the Golden Circle to outfit a 90-ton schooner, J. M. Chapman as a Confederate privateer.

William Law, who was hired as the navigator, informed the authorities, and Poole along with the others was jailed in Alcatraz accused of treason. He was released after Lincoln's amnesty of December 8, 1863, after swearing allegiance to the Union.

In 1864, Poole became one of the leaders of Captain Ingram's Partisan Rangers based in the Santa Cruz mountains. He took part in the Bullion Bend Robbery. On the next day Ingram's bushwhackers were apprehended by three lawmen including El Dorado County Deputy Sheriff Joseph Staples. During the gunfight Poole was hit by Staples in the face and went down. Other gunmen returned the fire that killed Staples.

On August 27, 1864, the jury found Poole guilty of first degree murder after fifteen minutes of deliberations. He was sentenced to death by hanging. One of Poole's accomplices, Preston Hodges, was found guilty of second degree murder and sentenced to 20 years in prison with hard labor. Several other people were charged, but were all acquitted.

The California Supreme Court upheld Poole's death sentence. Requests for clemency were signed by the sheriffs of Monterey County, Santa Cruz County, and El Dorado County. However, all pleas for leniency were rejected by the California Governor Frederick Low. Poole was hanged at Placerville, California on September 29, 1865.

See also

 California in the American Civil War

References

1820 births
1865 deaths
Lawmen of the American Old West
American law enforcement officials
American people executed for murdering police officers
People of California in the American Civil War
Confederate States Army officers
Bushwhackers
Outlaws of the American Old West
History of Monterey County, California
People from Monterey County, California
People charged with treason
People convicted of murder by California
People executed by California by hanging
Inmates of U.S. Military Prison, Alcatraz Island
Recipients of American presidential pardons